Partial list of the Movies produced by Modern Theatres (T.R.Sundram Mudaliyar)ltd.

References

Modern Theatres
Tamil cinema